Serraiocco is an Italian surname. Notable people with the surname include:

Federico Serraiocco (born 1993), Italian footballer
Sara Serraiocco (born 1990), Italian actress

Italian-language surnames